

Partial list of area newspapers
 Baytown Sun
 The Collegian (Houston Baptist University)
 Community Impact Newspaper
 The Courier (Montgomery County's only daily newspaper)
 The Daily Cougar
 Free Press Houston
 Galveston County Daily News
 Houston Business Journal
 Houston Chronicle
 Bellaire Examiner
 Memorial Examiner
 The Leader (The Heights, Garden Oaks, Oak Forest, and North Houston)
 River Oaks Examiner
 West University Examiner
 Houston Defender
 Houston Forward Times
 Houston Press (online only since November 2017)
 Houston Voice (LGBTQ Newspaper)
 La Voz de Houston
 La Prensa de Houston
 Mach Song (national Vietnamese paper)
 Manila Headline (Filipino community newspaper)
 Rice Thresher
 Sports Edition Magazine
 The National Outreach (national newspaper)

Defunct:
 El Día
 La Gaceta Mexicana
 Houston Post
 Public News
 Telegraph and Texas Register

African-American newspapers
The City of Houston has several African-American-owned newspapers published in the city. Allan Turner of the Houston Chronicle said that the papers "are both journalistic throwbacks — papers whose content directly reflects their owners' views — and cutting-edge, hyper-local publications targeting the concerns of the city's roughly half-million African-Americans." By 2011 many of the African-American newspapers began to establish presences on the World Wide Web.

Alternative newspapers
There was an underground newspaper called Space City, cofounded by Thorne Dreyer, which operated circa 1971 for around three and one half years. It was operated by a committee of half men and half women. A Ku Klux Klan group attacked the office with a bomb circa 1971.

See also

 News media in Houston
 Texas media
 List of newspapers in Texas
 List of radio stations in Texas
 List of television stations in Texas
 Media of cities in Texas: Abilene, Amarillo, Austin, Beaumont, Brownsville, Dallas, Denton, El Paso, Fort Worth, Killeen, Laredo, Lubbock, McAllen, McKinney, Midland, Odessa, San Antonio, Waco, Wichita Falls
 Texas literature

References

Bibliography
 
The Portal to Texas History: Houston County

Newspapers
Houston